Trifolium lupinaster is a species of flowering plant belonging to the family Fabaceae.

Its native range is Eastern Central Europe to Japan.

References

lupinaster